Indika Prabath Priyankara Batuwitarachchi (born 3 November 1974) is a Sri Lanka-born cricketer who played for the United Arab Emirates national cricket team. He has played two One Day Internationals for the United Arab Emirates.

External links 
CricketArchive
Cricinfo

1974 births
Living people
United Arab Emirates One Day International cricketers
Emirati cricketers
Sri Lankan cricketers
Bloomfield Cricket and Athletic Club cricketers
Burgher Recreation Club cricketers
Cricketers from Colombo
Sri Lankan emigrants to the United Arab Emirates
Sri Lankan expatriate sportspeople in the United Arab Emirates